It's a Natural Thang is the first album by R&B group For Real, released on March 22, 1994 (see 1994 in music).

Track listing
"Easy to Love" (Necia Bray, John Hess) – 4:35
"Where Did Your Love Go?" (Bray, Hess, Huey Jackson) – 4:42
"You Don't Wanna Miss" (Sherree Ford-Payne, Wendell Wellman) – 3:48
"Just a Matter of Time" (Ray Cham, For Real) – 6:26
"Li'l Bit" (Cham, For Real) – 5:10
"Don't Wanna Love You Now" (Bray) – 5:03
"You Don't Know Nothin'" (Hallerin Hilton Hill, Mervyn Warren) – 3:57
"With This Ring (Say Yes)" (For Real, John Howcott, Emanuel Officer, Donald Parks) – 5:18
"D'yer Mak'er" (John Bonham, John Paul Jones, Jimmy Page, Robert Plant) – 5:15
"The Harder I Try" (Bray) – 4:21
"I Like" (Fil Brown, N'Dea Davenport, Tony Robinson) – 4:43
"Thinking of You" (For Real, Annie Roboff) – 4:56
"The Prayer" – 0:30

Personnel
Alex Al – bass guitar
Gerald Albright – bass guitar, saxophone
Marc Antoine – guitar
George Archie – drums
Francis Bacon – bass guitar
Buddy Black – guitar
Fil Brown – guitar, drums, keyboard
Jonathan Buck – piano
Ray Cham – piano, keyboard, multiple instruments
Paulinho Da Costa – percussion
Derrick Edmondson – saxophone
David Ervin – keyboards, synthesizer programming
For Real – background vocals
Dave Foreman – guitar
Jason Hess – multiple instruments
John Howcott – keyboard
Tim May – guitar
Brian McKnight – strings, keyboard
Donald Parks – keyboard
Tony Robinson – keyboard
Annie Roboff – multiple instruments
Tory Ruffin – guitar
Sol Survivor – keyboard, multiple instruments
Art Zamora – guitar

Production
Producers: Necia Bray, Fil Brown, Ray Cham, For Real, Jason Hess, John Howcott, Brian McKnight, Marc Nelson, Emanuel Officer, Donald Parks, Tony Robinson, Annie Roboff, Sol Survivor, Stoker, Mervyn Warren, Wendell Wellman
Executive producers: Herb Jordan, Mark Mazzetti
Engineers: Paul Arnold, Fil Brown, Milton Chan, Kenny Jackson, Rob Russell, Tony Shepperd, Stoker, Louie Teran
Assistant engineers: Baraka, Tom Mahn, Brian Pollack, Dominique Schafer, Raymond Silva, Brian Young
Mixing: Ray Cham, Barney Perkins, Tony Shepperd, Stoker, Mervyn Warren, Dave Way
Mixing assistants: Milton Chan, Marc Frigo
Mastering: Dave Collins
Digital editing: Dave Collins
Programming: Jason Hess
Vocal arrangement: Necia Bray, Ray Cham, For Real, Sherree Ford-Payne, Jason Hess, Brian McKnight, Emanuel Officer, Annie Roboff
Art direction: Sandy Brummels, Richard Frankel
Photography: Victoria Pearson
Make-up: Kim Davis
Clothing/wardrobe: Debrae Little

References

Albums produced by Brian McKnight
For Real albums
1994 debut albums